The Argentina class is a series of 22 container ships built for Eastern Pacific Shipping and operated by CMA CGM. The ships have a maximum theoretical capacity of 15,052 TEU. The ships were built by Hyundai Samho Heavy Industries. The first five ships are powered by conventional engines and are equipped with scrubbers. The remaining ships will be powered by LNG instead.

List of ships

See also 

 CMA CGM Jacques Saadé-class container ship
 CMA CGM Antoine de Saint Exupery-class container ship
 Explorer-class container ship
 CMA CGM A. Lincoln-class container ship

References 

Container ship classes
Ships built by Hyundai Heavy Industries Group
Ships of CMA CGM